Crabbe, Crabbé, or Crabb is a surname. Notable people with the surname include:

Allan Crabb, Australian football player
Allen Crabbe, American basketball player
Annabel Crabb, Australian journalist and author
Buster Crabbe, American Olympic gold medal swimmer and actor
Callix Crabbe, American baseball player
Douglas Crabbe, Australian mass murderer
Brigadier General Eyre Crabbe (1852–1905), British Army officer
Frans Crabbe van Espleghem (1480-1553), Flemish artist 
George Crabbe, British poet and naturalist
Habakkuk Crabb, English minister
Henry A. Crabb, American judge
Joey Crabb, American ice hockey player
John Crabbe, Flemish merchant, pirate and soldier
John Crabbe (footballer), English soccer player
Kelly C. Crabb, American lawyer and author
Jason Crabb, American musician
Jeremiah Crabb, American Revolutionary War general
Lionel Crabb, Royal Navy frogman
Roy Crabb, American baseball player
Samuel Azu Crabbe, Ghanaian judge
Steve Crabb, Australian politician
Steve Crabb (athlete), British middle-distance runner

Fictional characters:
Franklin Crabbe, character in the novel Crabbe by William E. Bell
Henry Crabbe, lead character in the British TV series Pie in the Sky
Lee Crabb, antagonist in the Dinotopia book series
Nicholas Crabbe, character in an eponymous novel by Frederick Rolfe
Vincent Crabbe, character in the Harry Potter series

See also
Crabb, Texas, unincorporated community in Fort Bend County, Texas, United States
Jeroen Krabbé, Dutch actor